Gavin Scott Tucker  (born June 17, 1986) is a Canadian professional mixed martial artist. Tucker currently competes in the featherweight division for the Ultimate Fighting Championship (UFC). He had previously won the Extreme Cage Combat promotion championship in the featherweight category.

Background
Tucker was born and raised in St. Anthony, Newfoundland and Labrador, on June 17, 1986. Tucker began competing in mixed martial arts in 2009. He competed on the regional scene, almost exclusively in The Maritimes of Canada.

Mixed martial arts career

Early career
Tucker was the reigning Extreme Cage Combat Featherweight Champion when he was signed to the UFC in early 2017.

Ultimate Fighting Championship
Tucker made his promotional debut on February 19, 2017 against Sam Sicilia at UFC Fight Night 105. Tucker won the fight via unanimous decision.

Tucker faced Ricky Glenn on September 9, 2017 at UFC 215. Tucker suffered his first professional loss in this fight by unanimous decision. The referee was criticized by many observers, who felt that the fight should have been stopped earlier, as Tucker was clearly exhausted and had absorbed 142 significant strikes. UFC president Dana White tweeted, "This ref SUCKS" during the fight and tweeted after the fight, "Look at the poor kid's face!!! The ref needs his ass whooped!!!!" Other commentators blamed Tucker's corner for not throwing in the towel to stop the fight. Despite Tucker suffering 4 broken bones in his face as a result of the fight, he defended the referee's, Kyle Cardinal,  decision on his Facebook. 

Tucker was expected to face Andre Soukhamthath in a bantamweight bout on October 27, 2018 at UFC Fight Night 138. However, Tucker pulled out of the fight in early October, citing an undisclosed injury, and he was replaced by promotional newcomer Jonathan Martinez.

Tucker faced Seung Woo Choi on July 27, 2019 at UFC 240. He won the fight via a rear-naked choke in round three.

Tucker was scheduled to face Billy Quarantillo on April 25, 2020. However, on April 9, Dana White, the president of UFC announced that this event was postponed to a future date.

Tucker faced Justin Jaynes on August 8, 2020 at UFC Fight Night 174. Tucker won the fight via a rear-naked choke in round three. This win earned him the Performance of the Night award.

Tucker faced Billy Quarantillo on December 12, 2020 at UFC 256. He won the fight via unanimous decision.

Tucker was briefly linked to a bout against Cub Swanson on May 1, 2021 at UFC on ESPN 23. However, Tucker was tabbed as a short notice replacement to face Dan Ige on March 13, 2021 at UFC Fight Night: Edwards vs. Muhammad instead. He lost the fight via knockout in the first round.

Tucker was scheduled to face Pat Sabatini on November 20, 2021 at UFC Fight Night 198. However, Tucker had to pull out of the bout in late October, and the pair was rescheduled on April 9, 2022 at UFC 273. However, Tucker pulled out due to unknown reasons.

Championships and accomplishments

Professional titles
Ultimate Fighting Championship 
 Performance of the Night (One time) 
Extreme Combat Championship
ECC Featherweight Championship (One time)
One successful title defense

Mixed martial arts record

|-
|Loss
|align=center|13–2
|Dan Ige
|KO (punch)
|UFC Fight Night: Edwards vs. Muhammad
|
|align=center|1
|align=center|0:22
|Las Vegas, Nevada, United States
|
|-
|Win
|align=center|13–1
|Billy Quarantillo
|Decision (unanimous)
|UFC 256
|
|align=center|3
|align=center|5:00
|Las Vegas, Nevada, United States
|
|-
|Win
|align=center|12–1
|Justin Jaynes
|Submission (rear-naked choke)
|UFC Fight Night: Lewis vs. Oleinik 
|
|align=center|3
|align=center|1:43
|Las Vegas, Nevada, United States
|
|-
|Win
|align=center|11–1
|Seung Woo Choi
|Submission (rear-naked choke)
|UFC 240 
|
|align=center|3
|align=center|3:17
|Edmonton, Alberta, Canada
|
|-
|Loss
|align=center|10–1
|Ricky Glenn
|Decision (unanimous)
|UFC 215 
|
|align=center|3
|align=center|5:00
|Edmonton, Alberta, Canada
|
|-
|Win
|align=center|10–0
|Sam Sicilia
|Decision (unanimous)
|UFC Fight Night: Lewis vs. Browne
|
|align=center|3
|align=center|5:00
|Halifax, Nova Scotia, Canada
|
|-
|Win
|align=center|9–0
|Chris Coggins
|KO (head kick)
|ECC 25 
|
|align=center|1
|align=center|0:37
| Halifax, Nova Scotia, Canada
|
|-
| Win
| align=center| 8–0
| David Harris
| TKO (punches)
| ECC 22 
| 
| align=center| 2
| align=center| 2:02
| Halifax, Nova Scotia, Canada
|
|-
| Win
| align=center| 7–0
| Lyndon Whitlock
| Submission (rear-naked choke)
| ECC 15 
| 
| align=center| 3
| align=center| 3:09
| Halifax, Nova Scotia, Canada
| 
|-
| Win
| align=center| 6–0
| Robert Rende
| TKO (punches)
| ECC 14
| 
| align=center| 3
| align=center| 2:27
| Halifax, Nova Scotia, Canada
|
|-
| Win
| align=center| 5–0
| Jeremy Henry
| Submission (rear-naked choke)
| ECC 13
| 
| align=center| 1
| align=center| 5:00
| Halifax, Nova Scotia, Canada
| 
|-
| Win
| align=center| 4–0
| Christopher Corporon
| Submission (armbar)
| Elite 1:  Wild Card 2
| 
| align=center| 1
| align=center| 1:35
| Moncton, New Brunswick, Canada
|
|-
| Win
| align=center| 3–0
| David Spence 
| Submission (armbar)
| ECFP:  Resurgence
| 
| align=center| 1
| align=center| 3:09
| Trenton, Nova Scotia, Canada
| 
|-
| Win
| align=center| 2–0
| Michael Waugh
| TKO (punches)
| ECC 12: Rage
| 
| align=center| 1
| align=center| 3:02
| Halifax, Nova Scotia, Canada
| 
|-
| Win
| align=center| 1–0
| Ryan Connor
| Decision (unanimous)
| ECC 11: Redemption
| 
| align=center| 3
| align=center| 5:00
| Halifax, Nova Scotia, Canada
|

See also
 List of current UFC fighters
 List of Canadian UFC fighters
 List of male mixed martial artists

References

External links
 
 

Canadian male mixed martial artists
Featherweight mixed martial artists
Mixed martial artists utilizing Brazilian jiu-jitsu
Canadian practitioners of Brazilian jiu-jitsu
People awarded a black belt in Brazilian jiu-jitsu
Living people
Sportspeople from Newfoundland and Labrador
1986 births
Ultimate Fighting Championship male fighters